This is a list of galaxies with richest known globular cluster systems. As of 2019, the galaxy NGC 6166 has the richest globular cluster system, with 39 000 globular clusters. Other galaxies with rich globular cluster systems are NGC 4874, NGC 4889, NGC 3311 and Messier 87. For comparison, the Milky Way has a poor globular cluster system, with only 150-180 globular clusters.

References 

Galaxies